During the 2007–08 German football season, FC Schalke 04 competed in the Bundesliga.

Season summary
Several weak performances, culminating in a 5–1 defeat to Werder Bremen, saw coach Mirko Slomka sacked in April, with former players Mike Büskens and Youri Mulder taking over for the remainder of the season. The duo recorded five wins and a draw in their six-game stint in charge - although Schalke recorded four points less than the previous season and dropped down to third as a result, the club still comfortably qualified for the Champions League, with a ten-point lead over fourth-placed Hamburg. Büskens and Mulder stood down in July, and FC Twente manager Fred Rutten took charge.

First-team squad
Squad at end of season

Left club during season

Competitions

Bundesliga

League table

UEFA Champions League

Group stage

Knockout phase

Round of 16

Quarter-finals

References

Notes

FC Schalke 04
FC Schalke 04 seasons